Floresta is the fifth station on line B of the Medellín Metro from the center going west. At its entrance is the mosaic Our Virgin Lady of Sorrows. The station communicates with part of the Atanasio Girardot Sports Complex, the Ethnographic Museum of Miguel Ángel Builes, and the Medellin headquarters of Sukyo Mahikari, among others. The station was opened on 28 February 1996 as part of the inaugural section of line B, from San Javier to San Antonio.

References

External links
 Official site of Medellín Metro 

Medellín Metro stations
Railway stations opened in 1996
1996 establishments in Colombia